This article details the qualifying phase for taekwondo at the 2020 Summer Olympics. (The Olympics was postponed to at least 2021 due to the COVID-19 pandemic). The competition at these Games will comprise a total of 128 taekwondo fighters coming from their respective NOCs. Each NOC is allowed to enter up to one competitor per event, resulting in a maximum of eight competitors, four of each gender. 

Five quota places will be awarded to the top-ranked practitioners in each of the eight weight classes (four per gender) through the World Taekwondo (WT) Olympic rankings, while the highest-ranked practitioner of each weight category on merit points standing will grant one quota place each for their respective NOC through the WT Grand Slam Champions Series. If an NOC has qualified a minimum of two male and a minimum of two female athletes through ranking, it cannot participate in the respective Continental Qualification Tournament, unless it relinquishes the places obtained through ranking.

Four places have been reserved to the host nation Japan, and another four have been invited by the Tripartite Commission. The remaining 120 places are allocated through a qualification process in which athletes have won quota place for their respective NOC. 48 taekwondo fighters, 24 in each gender and the top 6 in each weight category, are eligible to compete through the WT Olympic rankings, while the rest through the five Continental Qualification Tournaments.

If an NOC having qualified through a Qualification Tournament relinquishes a quota place, it would be allocated to the nation of the next highest placed athlete in the respective weight category of that tournament as long as the addition of the place does not exceed the maximum quota for that nation.

Timeline

Qualification summary
The following table summarises the outcome of qualification for the taekwondo tournament at the 2020 Olympics. 57 nations gained at least one quota place for Tokyo. China and South Korea were the most successful nation, gaining six places each, followed by the leading European nations, Great Britain and Turkey with five apiece. The tripartie commission quotas were announced on June 24, 2021.

Men's events
Quota places are allocated to the respective NOC and not to competitor that achieved the place in the qualification event.

−58 kg

−68 kg

−80 kg

+80 kg

Women's events
Quota places are allocated to the respective NOC and not to competitor that achieved the place in the qualification event.

−49 kg

−57 kg

−67 kg

+67 kg

Notes

References

 
Olympic Qualification
Olympic Qualification
Qualification
Qualification for the 2020 Summer Olympics
2020